Far-right politics in the United Kingdom have existed since at least the 1930s, with the formation of Nazi, fascist and anti-semitic movements. It went on to acquire more explicitly racial connotations, being dominated in the 1960s and 1970s by self-proclaimed white nationalist organisations that opposed non-white and Asian immigration. The idea stems from belief of white supremacy, the belief that white people are superior to all other races and should therefore dominate society. Examples of such groups in the UK are the National Front (NF), the British Movement (BM) and British National Party (BNP), or the British Union of Fascists (BUF). Since the 1980s, the term has mainly been used to describe those groups, such as the English Defence League, who express the wish to preserve what they perceive to be British culture, and those who campaign against the presence of non-indigenous ethnic minorities and what they perceive to be an excessive number of asylum seekers.

The NF and the BNP have been strongly opposed to non-white immigration. They have encouraged the repatriation of ethnic minorities: the NF favours compulsory repatriation, while the BNP favours voluntary repatriation. The BNP have had a number of local councillors in some inner-city areas of East London, and  towns in Yorkshire and Lancashire, such as Burnley and Keighley. East London has been the bedrock of far-right support in the UK since the 1930s, whereas BNP success in the north of England is a newer phenomenon. The only other part of the country to provide any significant level of support for such views is the West Midlands.

History

1930s to 1960s

The British far right rose out of the fascist movement. In 1932, Oswald Mosley founded the British Union of Fascists (BUF), which was banned during World War II. Founded in 1954 by A. K. Chesterton, the League of Empire Loyalists became the main British far right group at the time. It was a pressure group rather than a political party, and did not contest elections. Most of its members were part of the Conservative Party, and they were known for politically embarrassing stunts at party conferences. Its more extreme elements wanted to make the group more political, which led to a number of splinter groups forming, including the White Defence League and the National Labour Party. These both stood in local elections in 1958, and merged in 1960 to form the British National Party (BNP).

With the decline of the British Empire becoming inevitable, British far-right parties turned their attention to internal matters. The 1950s had seen an increase in immigration to the UK from its former colonies, particularly India, Pakistan, the Caribbean and Uganda. Led by John Bean and Andrew Fountaine, the BNP opposed the admittance of these people to the UK. A number of its rallies, such as one in 1962 in Trafalgar Square, London, ended in race riots. After a few early successes, the party got into difficulties and was destroyed by internal arguments. In 1967 it joined forces with John Tyndall and the remnants of Chesterton's League of Empire Loyalists to form the National Front (NF).

1970s to 1990s
Britain's largest far right party post-war was the National Front; it reached a peak amount of members in 1972 with 14,000 members. Throughout the seventies, the NF saw a rise in popularity and influence, mainly at a local level; for example, in the 1973 West Bromwich by-election the NF won 16 per cent. Moreover, they polled 44% in a local election in Deptford, London, and finished third in three by-elections, although these results were atypical of the country as a whole. The party supported extreme loyalism in Northern Ireland, and attracted Conservative Party members who had become disillusioned after Harold Macmillan had recognised the right to independence of the African colonies, and had criticised Apartheid in South Africa. During the 1970s, the NF's rallies became a regular feature of British politics. Election results remained strong in a few working class urban areas, with a number of local council seats won, but the party never came anywhere near winning representation in parliament.

The smaller far right groups maintained anti-immigration policies, but there was a move towards a more inclusionist vision of the UK, and a focus on opposing what became the European Union. The NF began to support non-white radicals such as Louis Farrakhan. This led to the splintering of the various groups, with radical political soldiers such as a young Nick Griffin forming the Third Way group, and traditionalists creating the Flag Group.

John Tyndall formed the New National Front in 1980, and changed its name to the British National Party (BNP) in 1982. They, alongside the Conservative Monday Club, campaigned against the increasing integration of the UK into the European Union. However with Thatcher in her prime and Tyndall's reputation of a 'brutal, street fighting background' and his admiration for Hitler and the Nazis prevented the party from gaining any respectability. 

There was some success in 1993, BNP scored its first electoral success when Derek Beackon won a council vote seat on the Isle of Dogs with 34 per cent vote. They developed a policy of eschewing the traditional far right methods of extra-parliamentary movements, and concentrated instead on the ballot box. Nick Griffin replaced Tyndall as BNP leader in 1999 and introduced several policies to make the party more electable. Repatriation of ethnic minorities was made voluntary and several other policies were moderated.

2000s
The National Front continued to decline, whilst Nick Griffin and the BNP grew in popularity. Around the turn of the 21st century, the BNP won a number of councillor seats. They continued their anti-immigration policy, and a damaging BBC documentary led to Griffin being charged with incitement to racial hatred (although he was acquitted). The 2006 local elections brought the BNP the most successful results of any far right party in British history. They gained 33 council seats, the second highest gain of any party at the elections; in Barking and Dagenham, they gained 12 councillor seats.

In the 2008 local elections, the party won a record 100 councillor seats, and a seat on the Greater London Assembly, which would prove the party's high water mark. At the June 2009 European Parliament Election, the BNP gained two Members of the European Parliament for Yorkshire and the Humber and North West England. In October 2009, BNP leader Nick Griffin was allowed on the BBC topical debate show Question Time. His appearance caused much controversy and the show was watched by over 8 million people.

Current (2010–)

At the 2010 general election, the BNP fielded 338 candidates across England, Scotland and Wales and won 563,743 votes (1.9% of total) but no seats. Nick Griffin subsequently said he would resign as BNP leader in 2013, and was eventually expelled from the party in 2014 as the BNP fell into obscurity. The National Front fielded 17 candidates at the 2010 Election and received 10,784 votes.

The anti-Islamist group, the English Defence League (EDL), started to rise in popularity, appealing to nationalist sentiments on a cultural rather than explicitly racial basis. Originally formed in Luton in 2009, it protests against what it considers the Islamification of Britain by organising demonstrations in towns and cities across England, the largest of which occurred in Luton in February 2011. Soon after, right-wing populist party UK Independence Party (UKIP) started to gain popularity. Although labelled as far-right by some political observers, UKIP was not universally considered so. UKIP and the EDL benefited over this period from a rightward shift in the electorate, while former far-right parties such as the BNP and National Front became fringe groups and wield very little media attention or power.

In 2010, Robin Tilbrook, the chairman of the English nationalist party the English Democrats, met with Sergey Yerzunov, a member of the executive committee of the Russian nationalist group Russky Obraz. Shortly afterwards, Obraz announced that they were in alliance with the English Democrats. Other members of this alliance include Serbian Obraz, 1389 Movement, Golden Dawn, Danes' Party, Slovenska Pospolitost, Workers' Party and Noua Dreaptă. Since 2010, a number of former members of the BNP have joined the English Democrats, with the party chairman quoted as saying, "They will help us become an electorally credible party." In an April 2013 interview, Tilbrook said that about 200–300 out of the party's membership of 3,000 were former BNP members. He said it was "perfectly fair" that such people would "change their minds" and join a "moderate, sensible English nationalist party".

In 2011, the far-right, anti-Islamist party Britain First was formed by former members of the BNP. Britain First campaigns primarily against immigration, multiculturalism and what it sees as the Islamisation of the United Kingdom, and advocates the preservation of traditional British culture.  The group is inspired by Ulster loyalism and has a vigilante wing called the "Britain First Defence Force". It attracted attention by taking direct action such as protests outside homes of alleged Islamists, and what it describes as "Christian patrols" and "invasions" of British mosques, and has been noted for its online activism. Its leader Paul Golding stood as a candidate in the 2016 London mayoral election, receiving 31,372 or 1.2% of the vote, coming eighth of twelve candidates. Golding was jailed for eight weeks in December 2016 for breaking a court order banning him from entering mosques or encouraging others to do so.

In February 2013, the British Democratic Party was launched by former Member of the European Parliament (MEP) and National Front chairman Andrew Brons, who resigned from the BNP in October 2012 after narrowly failing in his campaign to unseat Nick Griffin as leader of the BNP in 2011. Brons remains the party's inaugural president, and the chairman is James Lewthwaite. The BDP has attracted former members of the British National Party (BNP), Democratic Nationalists, Freedom Party, UK Independence Party (UKIP), For Britain Movement, and Civil Liberty, including long-standing far-right political leader John Bean. Nick Lowles of Hope not Hate believed the party would be a serious threat to the BNP, commenting "The BDP brings together all of the hardcore Holocaust deniers and racists that have walked away from the BNP over the last two to three years, plus those previously, who could not stomach the party’s image changes". And in 2022 the BDP experienced a sharp increase in membership, with several nationalist local councillors and prominent far-right activists like Brian Parker and Derek Beackon joining the party. They are currently the only far-right British political party to have any elected representation, with 4 local councillors.

In June 2016, Jo Cox was murdered by a far-right extremist after being stoked by the campaigns surrounding the Brexit referendum. Scholars have suggested that far-right attitudes contributed to and were normalised by the result of the Brexit referendum.

In December 2016, the neo-Nazi group National Action was proscribed as a terrorist organisation.

In October 2017, former UKIP leadership candidate and anti-islam activist Anne Marie Waters launched the For Britain Movement. Unlike most far-right parties that came before them, For Britain were zionist, opposed to anti-semitism, and held more moderate views on social issues like LGBT rights. Former English Defence League leader Tommy Robinson and singer-songwriter Morrissey announced their support for the party, and fellow far-right and counter-jihad political party Liberty GB merged with For Britain. The party received support from several former members of far-right groups like the British National Party, Generation Identity, and the neo-Nazi terrorist organisation National Action. For Britain had some limited success in local council elections, but failed to make any significant breakthroughs in the parliamentary by-elections they contested. In July 2022, Waters announced on the party's website that the party was ceasing all operations with immediate effect, with their elected councillors subsequently joining the British Democrats.

In March 2018 Mark Rowley, the outgoing head of UK counter-terror policing, revealed that four far-right terror plots had been foiled since the Westminster attack in March 2017.

In November 2018 three people, Adam Thomas, Claudia Patatas and Daniel Bogunovic, were convicted of being members of the proscribed terrorist organisation, National Action, after a seven-week trial at the Crown Court in Birmingham. Thomas and Patatas have a child whom they named Adolf.

From 2018 to 2019, under the leadership of Gerard Batten, UKIP was widely described as moving into far-right territory, at which point many longstanding members – including former leaders Nigel Farage and Paul Nuttall – left. As the new permanent leader, Batten focused the party more on opposing Islam and sought closer relations with the far-right activist Stephen Yaxley-Lennon, otherwise Tommy Robinson, and his followers. Batten would leave the leadership of UKIP in 2019.

Since 2019 the former director of publicity of the BNP, neo-Nazi and anti-semitic conspiracy theorist Mark Collett has led a new far-right party called Patriotic Alternative.

In late 2020, The British Hand was founded by a 15 year old teenager. Since then the group have been at the root of far-right online propaganda, especially on the social media app Telegram. This led Hope not Hate to start an undercover investigation into the group and write an article exposing them.

In February 2023, fifteen people were arrested following violent clashes between police and far-right activists who were protesting outside a Merseyside hotel housing asylum seekers.

Election results

See also

 List of British far-right groups since 1945
 Far-left politics in the United Kingdom

References

 
Political movements in the United Kingdom
Far-right politics in Europe
United Kingdom
Right-wing politics in the United Kingdom